The Pin may refer to:

The Pin (comedy act), a comedy double-act with their own BBC Radio 4 show
A song from the Goo Goo Dolls' album Boxes